Tonković may refer to:

 Marija Tonković, Yugoslav basketball player
 Stanko Tonković, Croatian scholar, of the Faculty of Electrical Engineering and Computing, University of Zagreb
 Bela Tonković, Serbian-Croatian politician, of the Democratic Alliance of Croats in Vojvodina

See also

 Tonkovich

Serbian surnames
Croatian surnames